This is an incomplete list of Statutory Instruments of the United Kingdom in 1955. This listing is the complete, 28 items, "Partial Dataset" as listed on www.legislation.gov.uk (as at March 2014).

Statutory Instruments
The Consular Conventions (Income Tax) (Kingdom of Norway) Order 1955 SI 1955/156
The Consular Conventions (Income Tax) (United States of America) Order 1955 SI 1955/157
The Consular Conventions (Income Tax) (Kingdom of Sweden) Order 1955 SI 1955/158
The Consular Conventions (Income Tax) (French Republic) Order 1955 SI 1955/159
The Consular Conventions (Income Tax) (Kingdom of Greece) Order 1955 SI 1955/160
The Consular Conventions (Income Tax) (United States of Mexico) Order 1955 SI 1955/161
The Coal Industry (Superannuation Scheme) (Winding Up, No. 8) Regulations 1955 SI 1955/281
The Savings Bank Annuities (Tables) Order 1955 SI 1955/419
The National Insurance and Industrial Injuries (Luxembourg) Order 1955 SI 1955/420
The Consular Conventions (United States of Mexico) Order 1955 SI 1955/425
The Transfer of Functions (Iron and Steel) Order, 1955 SI 1955/876
The Motor Vehicles (Construction and Use) (Track Laying Vehicles) Regulations 1955 SI 1955/990
The Local Government Superannuation (Benefits) Amendment Regulations, 1955 SI 1955/1041
The Cinematograph (Safety) (Scotland) Regulations 1955 SI 1955/1125
The Cinematograph (Safety) Regulations 1955 SI 1955/1129
The Double Taxation Relief (Taxes on Income) (Isle of Man) Order 1955 SI 1955/1205
The International Organisations (Immunities and Privileges of the Commission for Technical Co-operation in Africa South of the Sahara) Order 1955 SI 1955/1208
The Coal Industry (Superannuation Scheme) (Winding Up, No. 9) Regulations 1955 SI 1955/1345
Boarding-Out of Children Regulations 1955 SI 1955/1377
The National Insurance (Modification of Trustee Savings Banks Pensions) Regulations 1955 SI 1955/1472
The Superannuation (Local Government and National Health Service) Interchange Rules 1955 SI 1955/1494
The Official Secrets (Prohibited Place) Order 1955 SI 1955/1497 (S. 136)
The Revision of the Army and Air Force Acts (Transitional Provisions) Act, 1955 (Appointed Day) Order, 1955 SI 1955/1807
The London Cab Order 1955 SI 1955/1853
The Commonwealth Telegraphs (Cable and Wireless Ltd. Pension) Regulations 1955 SI 1955/1893
The Cinematograph (Children) (No.2) Regulations 1955 SI 1955/1909
The International Finance Corporation Order 1955 SI 1955/1954
The Whaling Industry (Ship) Regulations 1955 SI 1955/1973

Unreferenced Listings
The following 15 items were previously listed on this article, however are unreferenced on the authorities site, included here for a "no loss" approach.
The Parliamentary Constituencies (Scotland) (West Stirlingshire and Stirling and Falkirk Burghs) Order 1955 SI 1955/2
The Parliamentary Constituencies (Scotland) (Glasgow Bridgeton, Glasgow Provan and Glasgow Shettleston) Order 1955 SI 1955/3
The Parliamentary Constituencies (Scotland) (Edinburgh Central and Edinburgh Pentlands) Order 1955 SI 1955/4
The Parliamentary Constituencies (Scotland) (Glasgow Scotstoun, Glasgow Hillhead and Glasgow Woodside) Order 1955 SI 1955/5
The Parliamentary Constituencies (Scotland) (Glasgow Pollok, Glasgow Craigton, Glasgow Govan and Glasgow Gorbals) Order 1955 SI 1955/26
The Parliamentary Constituencies (Scotland) (East Aberdeenshire, West Aberdeenshire, Aberdeen North and Aberdeen South) Order 1955 SI 1955/27
The Parliamentary Constituencies (Scotland) (Edinburgh North and Edinburgh West) Order 1955 SI 1955/28
The Parliamentary Constituencies (Scotland) (Bute and North Ayrshire and Central Ayrshire) Order 1955 SI 1955/29
The Parliamentary Constituencies (Scotland) (Midlothian, Roxburgh, Selkirk and Peebles and Edinburgh East) Order 1955 SI 1955/30
The Parliamentary Constituencies (Scotland) (Glasgow Springburn, Glasgow Central and Glasgow Kelvingrove) Order 1955 SI 1955/31
Singapore Colony Order-in-Council 1955 SI 1955/187
Police Pensions Regulations 1955 SI 1955/480
Police Pensions (Scotland) Regulations 1955 SI 1955/485
Indiarubber Regulations 1955 SI 1955/1626
Slaughter of Animals (Prevention of Cruelty) (Scotland) Regulations 1955 SI 1955/1993

References

External links
Legislation.gov.uk delivered by the UK National Archive
UK SI's on legislation.gov.uk
UK Draft SI's on legislation.gov.uk

See also
List of Statutory Instruments of the United Kingdom

Lists of Statutory Instruments of the United Kingdom
Statutory Instruments